Zé Mário (born 20 February 1992) is a Brazilian footballer who plays as a left back for Sampaio Corrêa.

External links

References

1992 births
Living people
Brazilian footballers
Association football midfielders
Sport Club Internacional players
Sociedade Esportiva e Recreativa Caxias do Sul players
Clube Náutico Capibaribe players
Sport Club do Recife players
ABC Futebol Clube players
Ceará Sporting Club players
Associação Ferroviária de Esportes players
Esporte Clube São José players
Maringá Futebol Clube players
Club Sportivo Sergipe players
Esporte Clube Novo Hamburgo players
Ypiranga Futebol Clube players
Campeonato Brasileiro Série A players
Campeonato Brasileiro Série B players
Campeonato Brasileiro Série C players